North Owersby is a village in the civil parish of Owersby  in the West Lindsey district of Lincolnshire, England, and about  north from the town of Market Rasen. North Owersby was a separate civil parish from 1866 to 1936.

The parish church is dedicated to Saint Martin and is a Grade II listed building. It was totally rebuilt 1762 using medieval ironstone masonry, and was altered in the 19th century. The font dates from the 18th century.

There are two Grade II listed farmhouses in the village, Hall Farm, and Manor Farm, both of which were built of yellow brick about 1835.

References

External links

Villages in Lincolnshire
West Lindsey District